Joseph Joffre was a marshal of France, Commander-in-Chief of French forces during World War I.

Joffre may also refer to:

Places
 Joffre Gorge, Karijini National Park, Western Australia
 Joffre, Alberta, Canada, a hamlet
 Joffre Peak, Columbia, Canada
 Mount Joffre, Alberta, Canada
 Joffre, Pennsylvania, U.S.

People with the given name
 Joffre Daigle (1925–1968), Canadian politician
 Joffre Desilets (1915–1994), Canadian National Hockey League player
 Joffre Guerrón (born 1985), Ecuadorian footballer
 Joffre Pachito (born 1981), Ecuadorian footballer
 Joffre Soares (1918–1996), Brazilian actor
 Joffre Stewart (1925–2019), American poet, anarchist and pacifist
 Joffre T. Whisenton (fl. 1980s), American academic administrator

People with the surname
 Jean Joffre (1872–1944), French actor
 Noris Joffre (born 1966), Puerto Rican actress

Other uses
 Joffre (shipwreck), a schooner that caught fire and sank in 1947 off Gloucester, Massachusetts
 Joffre-class aircraft carrier, a French Navy planned class of two
 French aircraft carrier Joffre, laid down in 1938, but never launched
 Avenue Joffre, Shanghai, China
 Joffre cake, a cake named after the marshal
 Joffre's pipistrelle

See also
 Marechal Joffre (grape), a wine grape variety named after the marshal
 Joffreville, Madagascar

Masculine given names